Simson is a surname, also a given name, and may refer to:

Notable surnames 
 Anna Simson (1835–1916), German  women's rights activist
 Eduard von Simson (1810–1899), German jurist and politician
 Ernst von Simson (1876-1941), German lawyer, diplomat and entrepreneur
 Otto von Simson (1912–1993), German art historian
 Bernhard von Simson (1840–1915), German historian
 Geoffrey Spicer-Simson (1876–1947), British Commander
 Harold Fraser-Simson (1872–1944), British composer
 Ivan Simson (1890–1971), British Brigadier
 James Simson (1740–1770), medical academic at the University of St Andrews
 Kadri Simson (born 1977), Estonian politician
 Lovisa Simson (1746–1808), Swedish theater director
 Marianne Simson (1920–1992), German dancer
 Michelle Simson, Canadian politician
 Robert Simson (1687–1768), mathematician and geometer
 Ronald Simson,  rugby player
 Sampson Simson (1780–1857), American philanthropist, "the father of Mount Sinai Hospital"
 Sergei Hohlov-Simson (born 1972), football player from Estonia
 Thomas Simson (1696–1764), medical academic at the University of St Andrews
 William Simson (1800–1847), Scottish painter

Notable given names 
 First
 Simson Garfinkel, author, computer scientist, and Internaut

 Middle
Jacob Anatoli (c. 1194 – 1256), Abba Mari ben Simson ben Anatoli, translator of Arabic texts to Hebrew
John Simson Woolson (1840–1899), United States federal judge
Thomas Simson Pratt (1797–1879), British General

See also 
 Simpson (name)
 Simonsen

Germanic given names
Germanic-language surnames
German-language surnames
English-language surnames
Scottish surnames
Jewish surnames

de:Simson